

The 1953 Australia rugby union tour of South Africa and Rhodesia was a series of 27 rugby union matches played by "Wallabies" in 1953, between June and October.

The test series was won by the Springboks with three test wins to one.

Touring party

Of the team of 30 players, 25 were from Sydney; 1 from Newcastle – Cyril Burke; and 4 from Queensland – Tom Sweeney, Garth Jones, Gavan Horsley and Colin Forbes. The touring party consisted of:

 Manager: John 'Wylie' Breckenbridge
 Assistant Manager-Coach: A.C. 'Johnnie' Wallace
 Captain: John Solomon 
 Vice-captain: Nick Shehadie

Playing squad: 
 Full-backs: Ray Colbert, Tom Sweeney (Qld) 
 Wingers: Eddie Stapleton, Garth Jones (Qld), John Phipps, Gavan Horsley (Qld) 
 Centres: Herb Barker, Jack Blomley, John Solomon, Saxon White
 Fly-halves: Spencer Brown, Murray Tate
 Half-backs: Cyril Burke (Newcastle), John Bosler
 Locks: Brian Johnson, Norman 'Mac' Hughes
 Breakaways: Keith Cross, Bob Outterside, Colin Windon, David Brockhoff 
 Second Row: Nick Shehadie, Ned Morey, Alan Cameron, Tony Miller, Colin Forbes (Qld), 
 Front Row: Bob Davidson, Jack Carroll, Max Elliott
 Hookers: Jim Walsh, John Bain.

Matches 
Scores and results list Australia's points tally first.

Bibliography 
 

All found on http://trove.nla.gov.au

  Townsville Daily Bulletin, Monday 11 May 1953 p 3 
  The Canberra Times, Monday 11 May 1953 p 3 
  Queensland Times (Ipswich), Tuesday 9 June 1953 p 3

Australia national rugby union team tours
Rugby union tours of South Africa
tour
1953 in South African rugby union